Phil Caira (24 February 1933 – 15 September 2003) is a British weightlifter. He competed at the 1956 Summer Olympics and the 1960 Summer Olympics.

References

1933 births
2003 deaths
British male weightlifters
Olympic weightlifters of Great Britain
Weightlifters at the 1956 Summer Olympics
Weightlifters at the 1960 Summer Olympics
Sportspeople from Dunfermline
Commonwealth Games medallists in weightlifting
Commonwealth Games gold medallists for Scotland
Weightlifters at the 1954 British Empire and Commonwealth Games
Weightlifters at the 1958 British Empire and Commonwealth Games
Weightlifters at the 1962 British Empire and Commonwealth Games
Weightlifters at the 1966 British Empire and Commonwealth Games
Weightlifters at the 1970 British Commonwealth Games
20th-century British people
Italian Scottish sportspeople
British national champions
Medallists at the 1958 British Empire and Commonwealth Games
Medallists at the 1962 British Empire and Commonwealth Games